Mazhar Ali Khan may refer to:

 Mazhar Ali Khan (journalist), Pakistan journalist and intellectual
 Mazhar Ali Khan (painter), 19th century painter from Delhi
 Mazhar Ali Khan (singer), Hindustani classical vocalist

See also 
 Mazhar (disambiguation)